The extrastriate cortex is the region of the occipital cortex of the mammalian brain located next to the primary visual cortex.  Primary visual cortex (V1) is also named striate cortex because of its striped appearance in the microscope. The extrastriate cortex encompasses multiple functional areas, including V3, V4, V5/MT, which is sensitive to motion, or the extrastriate body area (EBA) used in the perception of human bodies.

Anatomy
In terms of Brodmann areas, the extrastriate cortex comprises Brodmann area 18 and Brodmann area 19, while the striate cortex comprises Brodmann area 17.

In primates, the extrastriate cortex includes visual area V3, visual area V4, and visual area MT (sometimes called V5), while V1 corresponds to the striate cortex, and V2 to the prestriate cortex.

See also
List of regions in the human brain

References

Visual cortex